

The Flyer F600 NG is an ultralight aircraft from the Brazilian manufacturer Flyer Industria Aeronáutica, Eireli.

Design and development
The Flyer F600 NG is a modern further development of the Kolb Flyer developed by the US-American Homer Kolb in the 1970s, the beginning of ultralight aviation, as well as the Flyer GT which emerged from it and was built by the company in about 750 copies. 

The aircraft is designed as a strutted shoulder-wing with a conventional tail unit and has a fixed nose wheel landing gear. The cabin, with two tandem seat, can be entered through side doors.

Specifications

References

External links
Photo

Single-engined tractor aircraft
High-wing aircraft
Aircraft first flown in 2016
2010s Brazilian ultralight aircraft